Top Sergeant Mulligan may refer to:

 Top Sergeant Mulligan (1928 film), American silent comedy film
 Top Sergeant Mulligan (1941 film), American comedy film